Festival is an hour-long UK dramatic anthology series produced by the British Broadcasting Corporation and aired on the BBC from 1963–64. There were a total of 32 episodes adapted from writers ranging from William Shakespeare to Samuel Beckett. Titles include Krapp's Last Tape by Beckett, Comedy of Errors by Shakespeare, Lysistrata by Aristophanes, Under Milk Wood by Dylan Thomas, Murder in the Cathedral by T.S. Eliot, and Six Characters in Search of an Author by Luigi Pirandello.

Stars included Judi Dench, Cyril Cusack, Diane Cilento, Diana Rigg, Ian Richardson, Lee Grant, Milo O'Shea and Margaret Whiting.

References

External links

British drama television series
1963 British television series debuts
1964 British television series endings
1960s British drama television series
BBC television dramas
Black-and-white British television shows